A Rose for Everyone is a 1967 Italian film. It stars  Claudia Cardinale.

Cast
Claudia Cardinale : Rosa
Nino Manfredi : The doctor
Mario Adorf : Paolo
Lando Buzzanca : Lino
Akim Tamiroff : Basilio
Milton Rodrígues : Sergio
Célia Biar : Nilse
José Lewgoy : Floreal
Grande Otelo

References

External links

1965 films
1960s Italian-language films
Commedia all'italiana
Films directed by Franco Rossi
Films scored by Luis Bacalov
1960s Italian films